Jesse Myers was the head coach of the Rochester Rhinos in the USL Pro until his dismissal following a 1-6-1 start to the 2013 season. He was the assistant coach of the Richmond Kickers for 14 years.

References

1960s births
Living people
Limestone University alumni
Rochester New York FC coaches
Place of birth missing (living people)
New England Revolution non-playing staff
American soccer coaches